Draconopteris is a genus of ferns in the family Tectariaceae, with a single species Draconopteris draconoptera, according to the Pteridophyte Phylogeny Group classification of 2016 (PPG I).

Taxonomy
The genus Draconopteris was erected in 2016 by Li Bing Zhang and Liang Zhang for the species Aspidium draconopterum. A 2016 molecular phylogenetic analysis of Tectariaceae had separated two new genera, Draconopteris and Malaifilix, from Tectaria sensu stricto. The analysis arranged the genera as in the following cladogram, where an alternative broader circumscription has been added.

Other sources do not recognize the genus Malaifilix, and place its sole species, Malaifilix grandidentata, in a more widely circumscribed Draconopteris as Draconopteris grandidentata.

References

Tectariaceae
Monotypic fern genera